Anita Botnen (born 19 July 1965) is a Canadian gymnast. She competed in six events at the 1984 Summer Olympics.

References

1965 births
Living people
Canadian female artistic gymnasts
Olympic gymnasts of Canada
Gymnasts at the 1984 Summer Olympics
Sportspeople from Vancouver
Florida Gators women's gymnasts